James Alexander McDonald (19 June 1887 – 4 September 1954) was an Australian rules footballer who played with Richmond in the Victorian Football League (VFL).

Notes

External links 

1887 births
1954 deaths
Australian rules footballers from Victoria (Australia)
Richmond Football Club players